Brit Shalom may be:

 Brit Shalom (political organization), a now defunct group that wanted peaceful coexistence between Arabs and Jews and renounced Zionism
 Brit shalom (naming ceremony), a new Jewish alternative to traditional brit milah
 Brit Tzedek v'Shalom, an American Jewish political organisation
 Congregation Brit Shalom, former name of Temple Covenant of Peace, a Reform synagogue in Easton, Pennsylvania